The Invisible Man is a six-part television serial based on the science fiction/fantasy novella by H. G. Wells, screened by the BBC in the UK throughout September and October 1984. It was produced as part of the BBC 1 Classic Serial strand, which incorporated numerous television adaptations of classic novels screened in serial form on Sunday afternoons. Out of all the numerous film and TV versions of H. G. Wells' 1897 book, this remains to date the most faithful to the original text. The series was adapted by James Andrew Hall and directed by Brian Lighthill.

Plot
Starring Pip Donaghy in the title role, the series follows the same plot as the original book, of a deranged scientist who discovers a formula by which to make himself invisible, but is driven to insanity by his inability to reverse the formula and is evoked to use his invisibility to terrorize those around him.

Cast
 Pip Donaghy as Griffin – The Invisible Man
 David Gwillim as Dr. Samuel Kemp
 Lila Kaye as Mrs. Jenny Hall
 Ron Pember as Mr. George Hall
 Merelina Kendall as Lucy
 Gerald James as Dr. William Cuss
 Michael Sheard as Reverend Edward Bunting
 Frank Middlemass as Thomas Marvel
 Jonathan Adams as Teddy Henfrey
 Roy Holder as Sandy Wadgers
 John Quarmby as Constable Jaffers
 Frederick Treves as Colonel Adye

Episodes

Reception

Although originally intended to be screened on Sunday afternoons like the BBC's other classic serials, it was instead shown in a Tuesday evening slot after the BBC's Head of Drama declared the serial was "too frightening for a Sunday afternoon... far too horrific". The public reception to the serial was less than enthusiastic, with viewing figures averaging 7.4 million with an overall Appreciation Index of only 49. Viewing figures declined steadily as the series progressed, with many complaining that the storyline's pacing was too slow, the episodes were too short, and that the novel was not well-suited to this form of serialization, many arguing that its faithfulness was its main weakness. A Television Audience Broadcasting Report from BARB data stated that "The series was often considered slow and boring... and unredeemed by the quality of the acting or the production". Pip Donaghy's performance, nevertheless, was described as "well-received". Despite not being particularly successful at home, the serial achieved surprising success abroad, particularly in the Soviet Union where it was reported to have attracted over 64 million viewers. The serial was never repeated by the BBC, and remained almost forgotten until a DVD release in 2005.

External links 
 

1984 British television series debuts
1984 British television series endings
1984 TV series
1980s British drama television series
1980s British science fiction television series
BBC television dramas
Television shows based on British novels
Adaptations of works by H. G. Wells
1980s British television miniseries
English-language television shows